Goumero is a village in the municipal unit of Oleni, Elis,  Greece. In 2011 its population was 642. It is situated on a hillside in the western foothills of the Foloi plateau, at 500 m elevation. It is 2 km southwest of Agia Anna, 5 km northwest of Neraida, 8 km northeast of Karatoula and 13 km north of Olympia.

Population

History
Goumero is built in the area where the Ancient town Alesyon (Αλήσυον) or Alesaion (Αλησαίον), mentioned by Strabo, was located. The village was first mentioned as Vumero in the 14th century.

See also

List of settlements in Elis

External links
 Goumero GTP Travel Pages

References

Populated places in Elis